The Chaumont House is a historic house located in Chaumont, Jefferson County, New York.

Description and ghistory 
It was built between 1806 and 1820, and consists of a -story, five-by-three-bay Federal style main block of limestone, with a -story three-by-two-bay lateral wood-frame wing. Also on the property are a contributing carriage house and garage.

It was listed on the National Register of Historic Places on September 6, 1990.

References

Houses on the National Register of Historic Places in New York (state)
Federal architecture in New York (state)
Houses completed in 1820
Houses in Jefferson County, New York
National Register of Historic Places in Jefferson County, New York